Al-Alia International Indian School (AAIIS) is a K–12 gender-isolated English-medium community-based private foreign school in the al-Malazz neighborhood of Riyadh, Saudi Arabia, primarily serving the Indian diaspora, mostly Malayalis. Established in 2003 by Indian politician and businessman Thomas Chandy, the school offers Indian curriculum prescribed by the Central Board of Secondary Education, and is a member of the CBSE Gulf Sahodaya besides being approved by the country's Ministry of Education.

History

Establishment and early days 
In January 2003, Indian politician and educationist Thomas Chandy announced the establishment of Al-Alia Indian Central School in the capital's al-Aziziyah neighborhood during a press-conference among journalists in Riyadh. Chandy chose al-Aziziyah neighborhood in order to cope with the soaring education needs of the Indian community in Manfuhah and Ghubaira neighborhoods. The school was inaugurated on 3 April 2003 with 23 teachers and 200 students with Dr. Ram Thakur being its inaugural principal. In 2009, the school shifted its premises from al-Aziziyah to a new campus in al-Malazz neighborhood.

In 2012, Al Alia made headlines when it hosted a condolence meeting within its premises upon the death of former Indian ambassador to Saudi Arabia MO Hasan Farook Maricar. More than 40 different leaders of various Indian organization attended the event presided over by the school's then principal, Pious John. In May 2015, Al Alia International Indian School conducted an investiture ceremony of the Girls' Wing, in which Yara school's principal Aasima Saleem was invited as the chief guest. Al Alia celebrated its 17th anniversary in late 2019, in which Rajesh Kumar from the Indian embassy in Riyadh was invited as chief guest.

Inter-school events timeline 
In November 2013, Yara International School defeated Al Alia International Indian School at the third Inter-School Football tournament organized by LuLu Group. In 2014, Al-Alia took part in the Peevees UN Simulation Conference which was chaired by Capt. William Roe, managing director of the Saudi Aviation Flight Academy and hosted by Al Yasmin International School in Riyadh. In November 2015, Al-Alia participated in Lulu-Keli Inter-School Football Tournament hosted by LuLu Group at Nasriya Al-Asima International Stadium in Riyadh and also faced-off against Yara International School. In 2017, Riyadh Indian Association (RIA) hosted RIA Faber Castell Impressions 2017, in which 700 students from different countries participated, including Al Alia. IISR blanked out Al Alia in the 5th Keli Inter-School Football Tournament for Safa Makkah Cup held at Nadi Al-Riyadh Stadium.

Management and key people 
Al-Alia International Indian School is owned by Mohammad Hamad Abdullah Al Humaidi, a Kuwaiti educationist and is presently managed by a committee 3 permanent and 8 non-permanent members.

See also
Yara International School

References 

Private schools in Saudi Arabia